Trézel is a French surname. Notable people with the surname include:

Camille Alphonse Trézel (1780–1860), French military leader
Roger Trézel (1918–1986), French bridge player and writer

See also
Tezel

French-language surnames